Project 86 is an American metal band from Orange County, California, formed in 1996. The band has released ten albums, which have collectively sold nearly 500,000 units worldwide, two EPs, two DVDs, and one live album.

In 1998, BEC Recordings released a self-titled debut album that was well received by critics and consumers. Their second release, Drawing Black Lines, garnered attention from mainstream record labels; Atlantic licensed the album from Tooth & Nail Records, the parent company of BEC. The band's third release, Truthless Heroes, was released exclusively by Atlantic, after the band was bought-out of their original deal with Tooth & Nail. The band parted ways with Atlantic shortly after their third release, upon which they had a short stint as an independent. The band then negotiated a new contract with Tooth & Nail, and subsequently released three more albums, the last one being Picket Fence Cartel in summer 2009. After fulfilling their last agreement with T&N, in December 2011 the band announced a Kickstarter campaign via their official website and Facebook page, stating that "the fans are now our record label." Their eighth studio release, Wait for the Siren, was released on August 21, 2012. Their ninth album, Knives to the Future, was independently released by Team Black Recordings on November 11, 2014.

History

1996–1999: Formation and self-titled debut
According to the official Project 86 documentary "XV," Project 86 formed in mid 1996 by vocalist Andrew Schwab in Orange County, California.  Guitarist Randy Torres, who was a sophomore in high school, was the first member recruited. The original lineup included Schwab, Torres, Ethan Luck (Demon Hunter, Relient K), and bassist Matt Hernandez (Unashamed, The Dingees).  Drummer Alex Albert was added when Hernandez left the band after a few rehearsals, then Luck moved to bass from drums.  Luck left the band to join The Dingees in Summer 1997, after which high school senior Steven Dail joined in late 1997.

Schwab comments in a 2004 interview regarding the number 86 in the band name: "The generation before us used that phrase to describe when they would reject or remove something...Project 86 is like the whole idea of being rejected, or separate, or not going along with the current."  The group did not travel much initially; they decided to hone their sound and live performances before embarking on tours. In 1997, Project 86 was voted one of the top independent acts of the year by HM magazine readers. At Tomfest the same year, their performance was a big hit and Tooth & Nail Records, became interested and subsequently signed them.

Bryan Carlstrom produced their self-titled debut.  He had engineered albums by multi-platinum outfits The Offspring and Alice in Chains as well as producing labelmates Stavesacre .  Schwab drew upon personal struggles he was experiencing at the time to write meaningful lyrics. Sonny Sandoval, lead singer of nu metal group P.O.D., appeared as a guest performer. The album was released in June 1998 and was well received. It sold over 50,000 copies to date and gained mainstream exposure on MTV shows Road Rules and The Real World. Project 86 was observed by Allmusic to be the "most daring album at the time for its genre". The success of their debut made Project 86 a top seller for BEC/Tooth and Nail.  The band embarked on a pioneering tour called "The Warriors Come Out and Play Tour" in May 1999 with friends P.O.D. and Blindside as the middle slot, which drew crowds of 600-1000 across the nation.

2000–2003: Drawing Black Lines and Truthless Heroes
 The group worked on their sophomore record with producer Garth "GGGarth" Richardson. in Vancouver, BC.   Schwab wrote lyrics about a wider variety of issues, rather than just focusing on personal expression with their sophomore release: "The new album deals a lot less with me, and more with the world around us; Issues in people, society, culture". The sound was heavier and more progressive, with more hints of melody as well.  As soon as the album was finished it garnered interest from several major labels, and Atlantic records licensed the album for co-release with Tooth and Nail/BEC in March 2000.  Drawing Black Lines peaked at No. 37 on Heatseekers, and was well received by critics. By this time, listeners in the band had begun to amass a sizable fanbase. Despite heavy reliance on tour dates and word of mouth to inform people of its release, the album experienced some commercial success when it eventually sold nearly 120,000 copies. The band added Cory Edelmann, previously of No Innocent Victim, after the album was finished. Project 86 traveled nationwide with P.O.D., Hed PE, and Linkin Park on the "Kings of the Game" tour in October 2000. They also played a string of shows with Queensrÿche.

In 2002, Project 86 teamed with Slayer producer Matt Hyde to record their next album. The record was envisioned as a critique of post-9/11 America and the music industry. Formatted as a concept album, it told the story of a character attempting to find fulfillment in modern culture. "Songs were written and assembled with a certain ebb and flow in mind," said Schwab, "I approached the album like writing chapters in a book." The group spent over 14 months recording demos for Atlantic, which invested nearly $1,000,000 in the project when it was all said and done.  Because of the pressure to produce radio singles, the sound of the album was quite different from its previous releases, as was Schwab's cryptic lyrics, which represented the frustrations of being stifled creatively and feeling powerless in the process.  

Truthless Heroes was released in September 2002 and peaked at No. 146 on the Billboard 200. Their first and only single, "Hollow Again", peaked at No. 35 on Mainstream Rock Tracks. Atlantic refused to release the second single because they claimed the lyrics conflicted with the Iraq War effort. While lauded by critics for its pounding criticism of the media and entertainment industry, the album proved to be controversial, particularly the promotional website. The group performed with Taproot on their self-titled tour in fall 2002. In addition, they played shows with Thirty Seconds to Mars, Trapt, Blindside, Trust Company, Sevendust, and Finger Eleven.

2003–2006: Songs to Burn Your Bridges By and ...And the Rest Will Follow

In mid-2003 the band parted ways with Atlantic and their management team.  The departure from Atlantic, in particular, was a big disappointment for the band. "All of the hype about our future successes turned out to be just that – hype, " said Schwab in an interview, "We did not go platinum [...] the record fell short of expectations and did not come close to the impact of our previous effort." Project 86 then started an independent label called "Team Black Recordings". Work began on a new album after Hyde was convinced to produce again. Their fourth album, Songs to Burn Your Bridges By, was made available exclusively on their website in Fall 2003.

The following year, Project 86 re-signed with their previous label, Tooth and Nail. Songs to Burn Your Bridges By was re-released in June 2004. The new version included 3 new tracks produced by Aaron Sprinkle and mixed by J.R. McNeely, several new mixes, and featured new artwork. The release peaked at No. 36 on Heatseekers, and was met with positive reviews by critics. According to Schwab, the album was a return to the bands heavier roots, and a means to express the frustrations the band went through during Truthless Heroes. The group performed at Purple Door, a Christian music festival, later that year.  When Project 86 played their set, moshers threw mud everywhere and covered the stage and musical equipment. Thousands of dollars worth of musical equipment was damaged.

In Spring 2005, Project 86 reunited with Drawing Black Lines producer Garth Richardson to record their fifth album, ...And the Rest Will Follow. After spending several days recording demos, the band flew to Vancouver, British Columbia, to record at The Farm Studios Compound. The band filmed the entire production and later released a DVD documentary entitled Subject to Change: The Making of ...And the Rest Will Follow. The album marked a spiritual change for the group who felt humbled by their past experiences. "The record is about growing up and becoming a man and taking responsibility for your past mistakes," said Schwab, "[We are] refocusing our goals back to what they were when we started, reaching kids and inspiring them to live lives with hope and purpose."

To promote the album, Project 86 released a new song on PureVolume every Monday until the release date. ...And the Rest Will Follow was released in September 2005 and debuted at No. 131 on the Billboard 200. Critics were positive about the release. The band began a fall release tour and traveled with Spoken, Number One Gun, The Fold, and Mourning September. In January 2006, a live performance of the single "My Will Be A Dead Man" was broadcast on Attack of the Show!.

2007–2008: Rival Factions, The Kane Mutiny EP, and This Time of Year EP

In March 2007, Project 86 announced that Alex Albert had parted with the band on friendly terms to pursue other interests. Instead of searching for a full-time replacement, the band recruited Jason Gerken, formerly of Shiner, to play drums on the record. Production of their sixth album, entitled Rival Factions, followed suit with Deftones engineer Ulrich Wild. The album proved to be a large departure from their edgier material by sporting a distinct 1980s sound influenced by goth rock.

In the end, 40 songs were amassed for the new record, but only ten were used. According to Schwab, the album's title was chosen to represent "the tension that exists in everybody [...] the flesh and the spirit." It was also representative of their new musical direction, an attempt to polarize themselves from other heavy rock acts. Similarly to their last record, a documentary was filmed that detailed the recording process, entitled I Want Something You Have: Rival Factions The DVD.

Rival Factions was released in June 2007 and peaked at No. 124 on the Billboard 200, the band's highest debut to date. The record sold 6,000 copies in the first week and was well received by critics, who made favorable comparisons to Duran Duran, Billy Idol, and the Killers. The band proceeded to tour with labelmates MXPX, Showbread, and Sullivan on the summer Tooth & Nail Tour. A performance also took place at the annual Christmas Rock Night event in  Ennepetal, Germany that December.

Several tracks were recorded and mixed that were not included on Rival Factions. These songs were compiled with their previous remixes to form an EP. A cover of "Lucretia, My Reflection" by the Sisters of Mercy was also included. The Kane Mutiny EP was released exclusively on iTunes in November 2007.  Shortly after its release, the band uploaded a cover of "This Time of the Year" by Brenda Lee on iTunes. "Our version was a little bit more like A Nightmare Before Christmas ," declared Schwab. The single was well received and led Project 86 to build an entire EP around the Christmas concept. This Time of Year EP was released in November 2008. Unlike the previous EP, This Time of Year was made available in digital and physical formats. Jason Martin of indie rock outfit Starflyer 59 helped record both albums.

2009–2012: Picket Fence Cartel and XV Live
In early 2009, the band returned to the studio with Martin and Ulrich Wild to record their seventh album, Picket Fence Cartel. Time was spent leisurely crafting the album; previous endeavors had been limited by deadlines. "This time around, we said, 'Look, let's not just put out another record,'" said Schwab, "'Let's make sure we get the record to a place that we're happy with it.'" The band focused on a heavy metal sound. However, they did not entirely jettison their 1980s influences as synthesizers percolated several songs. Schwab's lyrics focused on his belief that power and corruption often "run hand-in-hand when it comes to human souls." "The world is teaching us that fame is to be sought after; that recognition will equal success, fortune and, ultimately, peace," he said, "But the search for and attainment of fame and wealth usually destroy us in the end."

The record was released in July 2009 and peaked at No. 137 on the Billboard 200. Critics praised the title for its barrage of heavy rock and spiritually minded lyrics. Later that summer, Project 86 traveled nationwide on the Scream the Prayer Tour with metalcore outfits The Chariot, Haste the Day, and Gwen Stacy. Coming mid-October, Project 86 started the Picket Fence Cartel Tour with Children 18:3, Showbread, The Wedding, and Yearling, and added a second part in spring 2010 with Flatfoot 56 and Wavorly. The band released their first live album, entitled XV Live, in December 2010 to commemorate their 15th anniversary. The album's songs spanned every studio album with the exception of the first.

Randy Torres, who had been gradually becoming less involved in the band over the previous several albums, decided to leave the band in late 2008 to work for Tooth and Nail records, and later, Microsoft.  Steven Dail followed suit approximately one year later, citing the need to stop touring and be home with his family.

2012–2013: Wait for the Siren 
Project 86 launched a Kickstarter campaign in December 2011 in an effort to "Make the fans the record label" after fulfilling their most recent contract with Tooth and Nail Records. Their eighth studio album titled Wait for the Siren was recorded in January and February 2012.

Wait for the Siren was recorded and produced independently through fan support via the band's 2011-2012 Kickstarter campaign. On May 24, 2012, Project 86 released four preview tracks for the tracks "Fall, Goliath Fall", "Sots", "Off the Grid", and "Take the Hill".

The album was officially released on August 20, 2012.

2014–2016: Knives to the Future 

In late 2013, Project 86 announced that they were about to work on their ninth album which will also be released independently. He also said they will also do an acoustic EP plus Andrew Schwab will also release a solo album which will also be produced independently. They started an Indiegogo funding campaign on Feb 11 and closed on April 12, 2014 (11:59 pm PT). They successfully got US$89,816 raised of a goal of $50,000.

Schwab announced that pre-production for a new album began on June 6 followed by a month-long recording session in Steelman Studios in Van Nuys, CA. Matt McClellan and the band collaborated on production and Steve Evetts mixed the album. Dan Mumford is scheduled to do the artwork. The band has spent the middle of the year in Los Angeles recording 18 new tracks including an acoustic EP. With a career spanning nearly 20 years and selling over half a million records Andrew Schwab feels this album is a special landmark for P86. He says, "We have loved pushing the envelope of evolution on every Project 86 release and this record is no exception. The inspiration behind this record is completely different and it's been incredible to write and record with such a talented group of guys.". Joining Schwab in the studio is Darren King (The Overseer) on guitar, Cody Driggers (The Wedding) on bass, and Ryan Wood (7 Horns 7 Eyes) on drums.

Project 86 indicated that the name of their new record will be Knives to the Future and will release on November 11, 2014. "Spirit of Shiloh", the first song from the album, debuted on SoundCloud.

In 2016, the band started a celebration for their 20th anniversary. They announced that they will release a new record and when supporting their PledgeMusic campaign, they send an EP to all pledgers, titled Influence EP, which consists of cover songs of bands that all influenced them. On September 13, 2016, the band announced their 20th anniversary tour with support from Death Therapy.

2017–present: Sheep Among Wolves & OMNI 

From October 2016 to October 2017, while the band was writing and recording new music, they released eight new songs total for pledgers who pre-ordered new album on PledgeMusic. On October 9, 2017, it was announced that a new album, Sheep Among Wolves, was to be officially released on December 5, 2017, in celebration of their 20th anniversary as a band. The album featured a three-piece lineup of Schwab, King, and Wolves at the Gate and The Overseer drummer Abishai Collingsworth.

In 2021, the band announced that their upcoming 11th studio album would be their last. On December 15th, 2022, the first single for the album, "Metatropolis", was released, along with the album's name, OMNI, along with the announcement that it would be a double album. On January 20, 2023, the band released a second single for their upcoming album, "0 > 1".

Musical style
Project 86's music is characterized by heavy rock and Schwab's "loud, eerie, and atmospheric" vocal style. Their sound has been likened to rock groups Helmet, Rage Against the Machine, and Tool. The adjective "intense" has frequently been used as a description. Rick Anderson of Allmusic called the music "dense and crunchy", while Albuquerque Journal writer Ron Gonzales declared it a "blisteringly heavy sound." Commenting on their musical style, Schwab said, "Our goal as a band has been to never make the same record twice. The only rule is that there are no rules. If there is a rule, it's that we try not to over-think things, that the music that comes out is honest and real, spontaneous and from our heart."

When Project 86 released their self-titled record, they were generally acknowledged to be a rapcore band. Schwab has maintained it was never intentional, "I think we got lumped in with that music because we [had] toured with P.O.D. and Linkin Park." According to writer Mark Allan Powell, the music featured "cryptic, down-tuned guitars" and "half-spoken, half-rapped" vocals. Drawing Black Lines saw their style adopt elements of traditional metal, groove metal, and hard rock. The band used their song "Pipedream" as a blueprint to build the album: "We knew that was one of the brightest spots on the album," said Schwab, "I just wanted to take what we did in 'Pipedream' and go further with it". Experimentation with noise occurred in track "Twenty-Three", and would be revisited on their fourth album with "Circuitry".

Truthless Heroes and Songs To Burn Your Bridges By generally focused on a "dark, rock musical direction". The group strayed from the style for their fifth album ...And The Rest Will Follow, opting to flirt with melodies and harmonies. Rival Factions marked a great departure when they embraced 1980s music and utilized keyboards. Their signature hardcore sound was reinstated for Picket Fence Cartel. "We have had a great time adding more melody along the way," insisted Schwab, "but in our hearts, we still really enjoy playing aggressive songs". Even so, some songs retained synthesizers while others boasted folk influences.

Influences
Rock bands have largely influenced the band like the Deftones, Sepultura, Sick of It All, and Snapcase. At an early age, Schwab listened to Slayer, S.O.D., and Metallica. He later discovered East Coast hip hop. During the recording of Rival Factions, the band took heavy influence from post-punk groups like Depeche Mode, Joy Division, Psychedelic Furs, and The Sisters of Mercy. Some of their favorite bands are The Cure, Portishead, Quicksand, Shiner, and Sunny Day Real Estate.

Lyrics
Vocalist Andrew Schwab is the band's lead lyricist. Schwab has said most lyrics are based on his emotions. He also tries to incorporate social commentary from literature. Prominent influences include comic book artist Chris Ware and writers Chris Bachelder, Don DeLillo, Aldous Huxley, George Orwell, and T. S. Eliot. He has written lyrics on a variety of topics, including alcohol abuse ("One-Armed Man"), conformity ("S.M.C."), emptiness ("Evil (A Chorus of Resistance)"), greed ("Cold and Calculated"), nightlife ("Molotov"), spirituality ("Chapter 2"), pornography ("P.S."), and child molestation ("Sioux Lane Spirits").

Members

Timeline

Discography

Studio albums

Live albums
2010: 15. Live.

EPs
2007: The Kane Mutiny EP (digital only)
2008: This Time of Year EP (Christmas)
2012: The Midnight Clear Single (Christmas)
2016: Influence EP (Cover EP)

Singles

Filmography

Documentaries
2004: Subject to Change: The Making of ...And the Rest Will Follow
2007: I Want Something You Have: Rival Factions the DVD
2012: XV the DVD

Music videos
"Pipe Dream"
"One-Armed Man (Play On)"
"Spy Hunter"
"My Will Be a Dead Man"
"Evil (A Chorus of Resistance)"
"Destroyer"
"Fall, Goliath, Fall"
"Knives to the Future"
"Metatropolis"

Notes

Notes

References

External links
 

American alternative metal musical groups
American Christian metal musical groups
Metalcore musical groups from California
American post-hardcore musical groups
Christian alternative metal groups
Christian hardcore musical groups
Christian rock groups from California
Musical groups established in 1996
Musical groups from Orange County, California
Nu metal musical groups from California
Tooth & Nail Records artists